Damar (meaning mineral ore) is a village in the Murgul District, Artvin Province, Turkey. It lies just to the south east of Murgul. The town was once a district center, but in 1950 its status was reduced to a township (belde). At the 2013 reorganisation, it became a village. Damar is a mining town and is one of the main producers of copper in Turkey.

Population

See also
Damar mine

References

Villages in Murgul District